The Odyssey Of Funk & Popular Music (also referred to as Vol. 1) is an album by Lester Bowie's Brass Fantasy recorded for the Atlantic label in 1997. It is the eighth and final album by Bowie's Brass Fantasy group and features performances by Bowie, Vincent Chancey, Gary Valente, Joshua Roseman, Louis Bonilla, Ravi Best, Gerald Brezel, Joseph Gollehon, Bob Stewart, Victor See Yuen and Vinnie Johnson.

Reception
The Allmusic review by Richard S. Ginell states "At the very least, the brasses sound fresh and interested in what they're doing, so there is pleasure to be had here".

Track listing
 "The Birth of the Blues" (Lew Brown, Buddy DeSylva, Ray Henderson) - 5:49
 "Next" (Joseph Bowie, Sebastian Piekarek) - 6:05
 "Two Become One" (Matt Rowebottom, Richard Stannard, Spice Girls) - 6:08
 "Don't Cry for Me Argentina" (Andrew Lloyd Webber, Tim Rice) - 9:09
 "Beautiful People" (Marilyn Manson, Twiggy Ramirez) - 6:57
 "In the Still of the Night" (Fred Parris) - 4:43
 "Notorious Thugs" (Sean Combs, Anthony Henderson, Steven Howse, Steve Jordan, Bryon McCane, Christopher Wallace) - 5:30
 "Nessun Dorma" (Giacomo Puccini) - 6:49
 "If You Don't Know Me by Now" (Harold Melvin, Teddy Pendergrass) - 4:20
Recorded on 27 September - 4 October 1997 at Systems Two Studio, Brooklyn, NY

Personnel
Lester Bowie: trumpet
Vincent Chancey: french horn
Gary Valente: trombone
Joshua Roseman: trombone
Luis Bonilla: trombone
Ravi Best: trumpet
Gerald Brezel: trumpet
Joseph "Mac" Gollehon: trumpet
Bob Stewart: tuba
Victor See Yuen: percussion
Vinnie Johnson: drums

References

1998 albums
Atlantic Records albums
Lester Bowie albums